Toni Datković (born 6 November 1993) is a Croatian professional footballer who plays as a defender for Spanish club FC Cartagena and the Croatia national team.

Club career
Coming from the island of Pag, Datković went through the ranks of Novalja, before moving to Rijeka, where, after six months at the lower-tier side Lokomotiva, he joined the Rijeka academy. Raising through the ranks, he became the U19 team's captain.

Datković never made his Prva HNL debut for HNK Rijeka, however, as he was sent on a loan to the Druga HNL side NK Pomorac Kostrena, where he remained for 2 years, until his contract expired. In the summer of 2014, he joined the Slovenian PrvaLiga side NK Zavrč, where he played 52 league games and scored three goals. He joined Koper in January 2016.

Datković moved abroad on 2 September 2019, joining Segunda División side Huesca on a one-year loan deal.

On 18 August 2020, he signed a three-year contract with Aris. After featuring rarely, he returned to Spain and its second division on 10 January 2021, after agreeing to a loan deal with FC Cartagena until the end of the season.

On 2 June 2021, Datković signed with Major League Soccer side Real Salt Lake on a two-year deal. The following 18 January, he returned to Cartagena after agreeing to a two-and-a-half-year contract.

International career
He made his debut for Croatia in a January 2017 China Cup match against China, his sole international appearance to date.

Personal life
Datković is the son of the football coach Ivica Datković, his brother Marin is also a professional football player.

Career statistics

References

External links
 
PrvaLiga profile 

1993 births
Living people
Footballers from Zagreb
Association football defenders
Croatian footballers
Croatia youth international footballers
Croatia international footballers
HNK Rijeka players
NK Pomorac 1921 players
NK Zavrč players
FC Koper players
NK Lokomotiva Zagreb players
SD Huesca footballers
Aris Thessaloniki F.C. players
FC Cartagena footballers
Real Salt Lake players
First Football League (Croatia) players
Slovenian PrvaLiga players
Croatian Football League players
Segunda División players
Super League Greece players
Major League Soccer players
Croatian expatriate footballers
Expatriate footballers in Slovenia
Croatian expatriate sportspeople in Slovenia
Expatriate footballers in Spain
Croatian expatriate sportspeople in Spain
Expatriate footballers in Greece
Croatian expatriate sportspeople in Greece
Expatriate soccer players in the United States
Croatian expatriate sportspeople in the United States